Vesterinen is a Finnish surname. Notable people with the surname include:

Jorma Vesterinen (1918–unknown), Finnish chess master
Paavo Vesterinen (1918–1993), Finnish farmer and politician
Vihtori Vesterinen (1885–1958), Finnish farmer and politician
Viljo Vesterinen (1907–1961), Finnish accordionist and composer

Finnish-language surnames